119 (one hundred [and] nineteen) is the natural number following 118 and preceding 120.

Mathematics 
 119 is a Perrin number, preceded in the sequence by 51, 68, 90 (it is the sum of the first two mentioned).
 119 is the sum of five consecutive primes (17 + 19 + 23 + 29 + 31).
 119 is the sum of seven consecutive primes (7 + 11 + 13 + 17 + 19 + 23 + 29). 
 119 is a highly cototient number.
 119 is the order of the largest cyclic subgroups of the monster group.
 119 is the smallest composite number that is 1 less than a factorial (120 is 5!).
 119 is a semiprime, and the third in the {7×q} family.

Telephony
 119 is an emergency telephone number in some countries
 A number to report youth at risk in France
 119 is the emergency number in Afghanistan that belongs to police and interior ministry.
 The South Korean emergency call number
 The Chinese fire station call number
 119 is the number for the UK's NHS Test and Trace service (created in response to the of COVID-19 pandemic)

In other fields
 119 is the default port for unencrypted NNTP connections.
 Project 119 is a governmental program of the People's Republic of China targeting sports that China has not traditionally excelled in at the Summer Olympics, to maximize the number of medals won during the games.
 119 is also the atomic number of the theoretical element ununennium.
 Union Pacific No. 119, a 4-4-0 American Type standard gauge steam locomotive of the Union Pacific Railroad that was memorialized in railroading history on the right-hand side of Andrew J. Russell's famous "Joining of the Lines" photograph taken on May 10th, 1869 at Promontory, Utah, during the celebration of the completion of the First transcontinental railroad, where it was cowcatcher to cowcatcher with Central Pacific Railroad's Jupiter (locomotive).

See also
 List of highways numbered 119

References

Integers